Franklin Martin was an American documentary film director, producer, screenwriter and actor best known for his sport documentaries Walking on Dead Fish in (2008) and Long Shot: The Kevin Laue Story in 2012. He founded and ran the production company Dutchmen Films based in Los Angeles. He died of glioblastoma in New York on December 1, 2018.

Career
Martin studied in Hofstra University and was a four-year letterman on Hofstra's Division I basketball team wearing the 22 jersey and graduated from the university with a bachelor's degree. He continued at Tennessee State University where he additionally coached and  graduated with a Master's Degree.

Martin started his film career as an actor taking roles in a number of films and TV series under the name Frank Martin, notably in Above the Rim where he befriended Tupac Shakur.

Starting 2005, he moved on to writing, producing and directing documentaries. He founded Dutchmen Films, his own production house. The name is a tribute to his alma mater, The Flying Dutchmen.

His debut film as director was Walking on Dead Fish (full title Hurricane Season: Walking on Dead Fish) about the tiny town of LaPlace welcoming New Orleans residents in the wake of Hurricane Katrina and the huge changes when the town's East St. John football coach declared all positions open (even those held by ESJ seniors) which put their scholarship chances, for many, their only chance at a college education, in jeopardy. But rather than fight or turn bitter, these young men banded together in the face of tragedy to create a team.

He followed that up with Long Shot: The Kevin Laue Story, another sports documentary, this time about a one-handed basketball player Kevin Laue who aspired to become a college basketball player.

Filmography

Director
2008: Walking on Dead Fish (Documentary) - also writer
2012: Long Shot: The Kevin Laue Story (Documentary) - also writer

Producer
2008: Walking on Dead Fish (Documentary)
2012: Long Shot: The Kevin Laue Story (Documentary)
2012: Children Rise (Documentary) (post-production)

Actor
1991: Haunted-ween as Farris
1994: Above the Rim as Bombers & Birdmen
1994: Hard Vice as Dave
2001: Peroxide Passion as Mormon Bob
2002: Ed (TV Series) as Pat Mahoffey
2004: El segundo as Matt
Also brief roles in Law & Order, All My Children (1996), Guiding Light (2003), Law & Order: Criminal Intent (2004) and Kiss Me Again (2006)

References

External links

American film directors
American film producers
Year of birth missing
2018 deaths